Laurie Davidson (born 1 July, 1992) is an English actor. He played a fictionalised version of a young William Shakespeare in the 2017 TNT television series Will, and played Mr. Mistoffelees in the 2019 musical fantasy Cats based on the musical by Andrew Lloyd Webber.

Early life 

Davidson was born in the Dulwich neighbourhood of South London. He is a 2016 graduate of the London Academy of Music and Dramatic Art (LAMDA).

Career 

After arriving at the LAMDA, he earned a part in Anton Chekhov's The Seagull, which is where his agent first noticed him. Davidson was a newcomer to television prior to his Will casting; his prior work included stage work and a minor role in the film Vampire Academy. He has also been cast in the BBC film Diana & I as a journalist who is present at the time of the death of Princess Diana.

Will 

A casting director for Yorgos Lanthimos' The Favourite suggested that he audition for Will. He had several rounds of auditions. Just as school was set to resume following Christmas of his final year at LAMDA and as he was set to play Tevye in a school production of Fiddler on the Roof, he was informed in January 2016 that he was cast in Will, and he dropped out of Fiddler to shoot the show's pilot.

To prepare for his modern take on Shakespeare, Davidson did not focus on modern depictions of Shakespeare, such as Joseph Fiennes performance in Shakespeare in Love, but he did use Straight Outta Compton and 8Mile for inspiration, on the advice of director Shekhar Kapur. He also relied on the works attributed to Shakespeare to learn about him. TNT picked up the show in May 2016, but Davidson graduated from LAMDA in July 2016—on schedule. Will premiered on 10 July 2017.

Cats

In September 2018, he joined the cast of Cats.

Filmography

Film

Television

Theater

Notes

External links 

21st-century English male actors
Living people
Date of birth missing (living people)
Alumni of the London Academy of Music and Dramatic Art
English male television actors
Male actors from London
People from Dulwich
English male Shakespearean actors
English male stage actors
1992 births